Friedrich Krupp (1787–1826) was a German industrialist.

Friedrich Krupp may refer to:
Friedrich Alfred Krupp (1854–1902), German industrialist
Friedrich Krupp Germaniawerft, German shipbuilding firm

See also
Krupp

Krupp, Friedrich